AWAY: The Survival Series is an indie action-adventure video game developed and published by Canadian studio Breaking Walls. It was released on September 28, 2021 for Microsoft Windows, PlayStation 5, PlayStation 4, and on a yet to be determined date for Xbox One.

References 

2021 video games
Windows games
PlayStation 4 games
Action-adventure games
Indie video games
Video games developed in Canada
Survival video games
Single-player video games
Xbox One games